The Gunnison Gorge National Conservation Area is a  National Conservation Area located in west-central Colorado near Montrose. It is managed by the Bureau of Land Management (BLM) as part of the National Landscape Conservation System.   were designated in the Black Canyon of the Gunnison National Park and Gunnison Gorge National Conservation Area Act of 1999 (Public Law 106-76). The Black Canyon of the Gunnison Boundary Revision Act of 2003 (Public Law 108-78) expanded the NCA to its current size.

References

External links
 Gunnison Gorge National Conservation Area - BLM page

National Conservation Areas of the United States
Gunnison River
Bureau of Land Management areas in Colorado
Protected areas of Delta County, Colorado
Protected areas of Montrose County, Colorado
Units of the National Landscape Conservation System
Protected areas established in 1999
1999 establishments in Colorado